"The Man Who Was Never Born" (original title: "Cry of the Unborn") is an episode of the original The Outer Limits television show. It was first broadcast on October 28, 1963, during the first season.

Plot
Having accidentally travelled through time, astronaut Joseph Reardon lands on Earth in the year 2148 A.D. to find it a desolate realm. He meets Andro, a mutated human stricken with a disfiguring disease for which there is no cure. Andro is one of the few survivors of a biological disaster brought on by an ambitious scientist named Bertram Cabot Jr., who isolated and developed a viral symbiont from an interstellar microbe. Cabot's symbiont physically altered the human race, precluding the ability to reproduce, and turned much of Earth's landscape into a barren wasteland.

Andro laments that there is no hope for mankind to survive after the last of his generation die off. But Reardon claims there is hope, and decides to see if he can return to his own time, taking Andro with him to show others what the future will be and to prevent the disastrous outcome. However, while making the return journey through the time rift, Reardon suddenly feels himself slowly dying and mysteriously vanishes, possibly from the stress brought about by making the journey twice in one day. He manages to tell Andro to kill Cabot if he has no other way to stop him, to save billions of lives at the cost of one.

The deformed Andro can project himself as a normal human using hypnotic suggestion, and uses this ability to begin searching for some way to stop Cabot's work, even if it means his assassination. It soon becomes clear that Andro has arrived on Earth prematurely: Bertram Cabot Jr. has not been born yet, and his parents, Noelle Anderson and Bertram Cabot Sr., are only about to be married. Andro, in the guise of a normal human of the time, attempts without success to convince Cabot that he should not marry Noelle.

Andro himself begins to fall in love with Noelle. While planning to shoot Cabot during the couple's wedding ceremony with a revolver obtained from Reardon, Andro hesitates and is in turn assaulted by Cabot and his wedding party, revealing his true appearance in the process. Andro flees, but Noelle follows him. He explains his mission, and Noelle confesses that she has fallen in love with him. She convinces him to take her with him to the future, thereby avoiding any possibility that she and Cabot will have a child.

However, the flow of time has been altered by Andro and Noelle's actions: because Bertram Cabot Jr. was never born, the symbiont that made Andro's mutated existence possible never existed, meaning that Andro was also never born. Andro disappears just as the ship arrives in 2148 A.D., leaving Noelle, weeping, to face the future alone. The final scene breaks the fourth wall by showing Noelle in her spaceship chair next to a similar empty chair, on a dimly illuminated stage instead of in a spaceship.

Cast
 Martin Landau – as Andro
 Shirley Knight – as Noelle Anderson
 Karl Held – as Captain Joseph Reardon
 John Considine – as Bertram Cabot
 Maxine Stuart – as Mrs. McCluskey
 Marlowe Jensen – as Minister

Production
The story's writer, Anthony Lawrence, said in an interview that the story was inspired by "...one of my old favorites, Jean Cocteau's Beauty and the Beast, the French version, which was a beautiful film. I was thinking of that film, and also just the idea that had always kind of fascinated me. Joseph Stefano loved the idea, and it had [in it], as I remember, a lot of what I was feeling at the time. I always liked romantic stories, and this was a chance to do something that you really don't get to do very often in television. I gravitated toward that."

See also

La Jetée, 1962 French short film in which a man travels back in time from a devastated post-nuclear future as part of a project to rebuild.
12 Monkeys, 1995 American film based on La jetée in which the protagonist must find in the past the source of a bacteriological infection that has devastated his future earth. 
"Patient Zero", episode of the 1990s Outer Limits revival series in which a future soldier travels back in time to prevent the formation of a deadly virus

References

The Outer Limits (1963 TV series season 1) episodes
1963 American television episodes
Television episodes about time travel
Fiction set in 1963
Post-apocalyptic television episodes
Works about astronauts